These are the songs that reached number one on the Top 50 Best Sellers chart in 1952 as published by Cash Box magazine. Until October 25, 1952, artists were not specified in the charts of this period so songs may represent more than one version. The artist who most popularized each song is listed. Beginning October 25, Cash Box began tracking specific versions of songs and thus began listing the artists.

See also
1952 in music
List of Billboard number-one singles of 1952

References
https://web.archive.org/web/20110519073035/http://cashboxmagazine.com/archives/50s_files/1952.html

1952
1952 record charts
1952 in American music